Heinrich Hermann Freytag (born around 15 April 1759 in Hamburg, died 14 April 1811) was a German/Dutch organ builder. A pupil of Albertus Antonius Hinsz, he became one of the most important organ builders in the Netherlands around 1800. His work, of a high standard, follows in the traditions established by Arp Schnitger.

Life 

Freytag was the son of a cabinet-maker from Württemberg. In 1784 he became an apprentice in the former workshop of Schnitger, which had been taken over by Hinsz. In 1793 he married the widow of an innkeeper from Groningen, Hiskia Hornemann (1765-1817). They produced ten children, of whom five reached adulthood. In order that his wife could continue her business, Freytag entered the guild of innkeepers, and received the "small citizenship" of the city of Groningen. When Snitger died in 1799 Freytag took over the organ-building workshop, and led north-Dutch organ building into a new era of productivity. He built to a high standard of craftsmanship in the traditions of Arp Schnitger. Freytags pipework has a more elegant tone compared to that of Hinsz. Although his early instruments are architecturally very much in the style of Schnitger, his organ casework was increasingly influenced by Classicism.

After Freytag's death in 1811, his employees kept the workshop going under the temporary management of his widow, as his own children were still too small to take over. In 1817, Freytag's son and heir, Herman Eberhard Freytag (1796–1869) took over the business, together with his brother Barthold Joachim (1799–1829). Herman Eberhard also worked in Germany, and carried out restorations of Hinsz's organs in Leer and Weener. Herman Eberhard's son, Willem Fredrik Freytag (1825–1861) was expected to continue the family business, but died before his father.

Organs on which Freytag worked 

The roman numerals indicate the number of manuals. An uppercase "P" indicates an independent pedal organ with its own sounding stops, while a lowercase "p" indicates a pull-down pedal linked to the keyboards, merely allowing the player to play manual keyboard notes with their feet. The Arabic numerals indicate the number of sounding registers (i.e. stop-knobs excluding accessories such as tremulants and couplers).

Literature

External links 

 Bellingwolde organ (notes from a CD sleeve)
 Doesburg cabinet organ (in Dutch)

References 

1759 births
1811 deaths